The men's hammer throw at the 1962 British Empire and Commonwealth Games as part of the athletics programme was held at the Perry Lakes Stadium on Saturday 1 December 1962.

Payne won by  ahead of the Australian pairing of Dick Leffler and Robert Brown.

Records

Final

References

Men's hammer throw
1962